Cross Belt is a 1970 Indian Malayalam-language film, directed by Crossbelt Mani and produced by A. Ponnappan. The film stars Sathyan, Sharada, Kaviyoor Ponnamma and Adoor Bhasi. The film had musical score by M. S. Baburaj.

Cast

Sathyan as Rajasekharan Nair
Sharada as Ammu
Kaviyoor Ponnamma as Bhavani
Adoor Bhasi as Sahasram Iyer
Thikkurissy Sukumaran Nair as Krishnan Thambi
P. J. Antony as Sekhara Panicker
Aranmula Ponnamma as Ammukutty Amma
Bahadoor as Thilakan
Kottarakkara Sreedharan Nair
Kottayam Chellappan as Daniel
N. Govindankutty
Paravoor Bharathan as Narayana Pilla
Ushakumari as Leelamani

Soundtrack
The music was composed by M. S. Baburaj and the lyrics were written by Sreekumaran Thampi.

References

External links
 

1970 films
1970s Malayalam-language films